Mahamat is a Chadian surname. Notable people with the surname include:
 Azrack Mahamat (born 1988), French-born Chadian footballer
 Bachir Mahamat (born 1996), Chadian sprinter
 Brahim Mahamat (born 1995), Chadian footballer
 Dadji Rahamata Ahmat Mahamat, Chadian feminist activist
 Djamal Mahamat (born 1983), Libyan footballer
 Ngouloure Mahamat (born 1990), Cameroonian footballer
 Nouh Doungous Mahamat (born 1982), former Chadian football player

Surnames of Chadian origin
Surnames of Cameroonian origin
Surnames of Libyan origin
Surnames of Central African Republic origin